

Best selling pharmaceuticals of U.S. Market 
The top 5 best selling pharmaceuticals 2015-2019. Sales in billion USD.

Best selling pharmaceuticals of 2017/18 
The top 16 best selling pharmaceuticals of 2017/18.

Largest selling pharmaceutical products of 2015 
Drugs with sales above $5 billion in 2015 included:

Best selling pharmaceuticals of 2013 
For the fourth quarter of 2013, the largest selling drugs were:

See also
 List of drugs
 Lists about the pharmaceutical industry

References

Pharmaceutical products
Largest selling pharmaceutical products
Pharmaceutical products